Carnero Lake is a high elevation shallow lake in Apache County, Arizona. Built in 1979, the lake quickly became popular with anglers, to the dismay of downstream water users. Because of the dispute, the Arizona Game and Fish discontinued stocking for many years. In 1999, the Arizona Game and Fish has acquired a major share of the water rights, setting the stage for a new and vigorous trout fishery.

Location

Due to snow and ice, these roads are typically closed from mid-November to mid-April.

Description
Carnero Lake is a shallow  headwater impoundment of Carnero Creek. It has a maximum depth of ten feet. It's quite weedy, which is problematic for fishing, but is also an indicator of a highly productive lake. It's stocked with subcatchable and catchable-sized rainbow trout and tiger trout in the spring. Because it's at high elevation and shallow, it's subject to periodic winter kills.

Fish species
 Rainbow trout
 Tiger trout

See also
 White Mountain Grasslands Wildlife Area

References

External links
 Arizona Boating Locations Facilities Map
 Arizona Fishing Locations Map

Lakes of Arizona
Lakes of Apache County, Arizona
Apache-Sitgreaves National Forests